Protohippus is an extinct three-toed genus of horse. It was roughly the size of a modern donkey.  Fossil evidence suggests that it lived during the Late Miocene (Clarendonian to Hemphillian), from about 13.6 Ma to 5.3 Ma.

Analysis of Protohippus skull and teeth suggests that it is most closely related to the genus Calippus.

Species include:
 P. vetus
 P. perditus
 P. supremus (also P. simus)
 P. gidleyi

See also 
 Eohippus
 Mesohippus

References 

Miocene horses
Prehistoric placental genera
Miocene mammals of North America
Clarendonian
Hemphillian
Fossil taxa described in 1858
Taxa named by Joseph Leidy